McCuskey is a surname. Notable people with the surname include:

Chandler McCuskey Brooks (1905–1989), American physiologist
JB McCuskey (born 1981), West Virginia politician
John F. McCuskey (born 1947), West Virginia politician and justice of the Supreme Court of Appeals of West Virginia.
Michael P. McCuskey (born 1948), American judge
Sidney Wilcox McCuskey  (1907–1979), American mathematician and astronomer

See also
2007 McCuskey, a main-belt asteroid